Ludowy Klub Sportowy Sparta Janowiec Wielkopolski is a football club in Janowiec Wielkopolski, Poland, founded in 1925. They play in Liga Okręgowa (VI level)

External links
 Official website

References
 info about club on 90minut.pl

Association football clubs established in 1925
1925 establishments in Poland
Żnin County
Football clubs in Kuyavian-Pomeranian Voivodeship